Scandinavian Airlines System (SAS), commonly known as Scandinavian Airlines, is the national airline of Denmark, Norway, and Sweden. Owned by the eponymous SAS Group, it operates out of three main hubs, Copenhagen Airport, Stockholm-Arlanda Airport, and Oslo Airport, Gardermoen. It transported 22.9 million passengers to 90 destinations on an average 683 flights daily in 2011.

Of the airline's twenty-three major accidents and incidents, four have resulted in the loss of life. The first was the 1948 Northwood mid-air collision over London, with which 39 fatalities made it the deadliest accident in the United Kingdom at the time. In the 1960 Flight 871 to Istanbul, the aircraft descended too early, resulting in 42 people perishing in the first accident of the Sud Aviation Caravelle. The same cause was responsible nine years later in Los Angeles, when 15 people were killed in Flight 933. The final and most deadly accident was Flight 686, where 114 people were killed in a runway collision in Milan.

SAS has been subject to three hijackings—none of which have resulted in the loss of lives. Two were successful: Flight 130 in 1972 was captured by the Croatian National Resistance, while Flight 347 in 1994 was captured in the ruse of the Bosnian War.  Two accidents have been dramatized as part of the television series Mayday. In addition to Flight 686, it featured Flight 751, which crashed without fatalities in a forest in Gottröra after foreign object damage. Fifteen accidents have resulted in aircraft being written off. This includes two of the Dash 8 landing gear incidents in September 2007, which resulted in a group-wide retirement of the Bombardier Dash 8-Q400.

List
The following is a list of all major accidents involving Scandinavian Airlines. It includes all fatal accidents, all write-offs, all hijackings, and other major incidents. SAS registers its aircraft in one of the three Scandinavian countries. Aircraft with registration starting with LN are registered in Norway, SE in Sweden, and OY in Denmark. Unless otherwise noted, all accidents and incidents had no fatalities and ended with the aircraft being written off. All times are local.

References

 

 

 
Scandinavian Airlines